Isabelle Nanty (born 21 January 1962) is a French actress, film and theatre director and screenwriter.

Career
She was a teacher for several years at the Cours Florent, and then received a nomination for the César Award for Most Promising Actress for her performance in Tatie Danielle (1990), and two nominations for the César Award for Best Supporting Actress for Amélie (2001) and Not on the Lips (2003).

She's also known for her roles in La Belle Histoire (1992) directed by Claude Lelouch, Les Visiteurs (1993), Asterix & Obelix: Mission Cleopatra (2002), her leading role in Les Tuche (2011), Serial Teachers (2013) and the sequel Serial Teachers 2 (2015).

Personal life
In 2004, she adopted Tallulah, a one-and-a-half-year-old girl, born in 2002 in China.

Theater

Actress

Director

Filmography

References

External links

 

1962 births
Living people
People from Verdun
French women film directors
French film directors
French film actresses
French television actresses
Cours Florent alumni
20th-century French actresses
21st-century French actresses
French stage actresses
French theatre directors
French women screenwriters
French screenwriters
French people of Norwegian descent